Rhopalus lepidus is a species of scentless plant bugs belonging to the family Rhopalidae, subfamily Rhopalinae.

It is found in Bulgaria, France, Italy, Greece, Spain, Portugal and Jugoslavia.

References

External links
 Biolib

Hemiptera of Europe
Insects described in 1861
Rhopalini